"The Hunter" is a hit song by Irish group Clannad from 1989.
It appears on their compilation album Past Present, and also on the 2003 remastered edition of Sirius. A promotional video for the single was directed by Nigel Grierson, using the radio edit of the song.

Track listing
7" vinyl (PB 42609)
 "The Hunter"
 "Atlantic Realm"

12" vinyl (PT 42610)
 "The Hunter"
 "Atlantic Realm"
 "Turning Tide"

5" compact disc (PD 42610)
 "The Hunter - radio edit" (4:08)
 "Skellig - single edit" (4:27)
 "Turning Tide" (4:38)
 "Atlantic Realm - single edit" (3:25)

References

1989 singles
Clannad songs
1989 songs
Songs written by Pól Brennan
RCA Records singles
Songs written by Ciarán Brennan